Budleigh Salterton is a seaside town  on the coast in East Devon, England,  south-east of Exeter. It lies within the East Devon Area of Outstanding Natural Beauty, and forms much of the electoral ward of Budleigh, whose ward population at the 2011 census was 5,967.

Features

Budleigh Salterton lies at the mouth of the River Otter, where the estuary includes a bed of reeds and a grazing marsh, which form a haven for migratory birds and a Site of Special Scientific Interest for bird watchers. It has a designated area for naturists.

The village is crossed by the South West Coast Path, with clifftop routes eastwards to Sidmouth and westwards to Exmouth. The pebble beach and cliffs are part of the Jurassic Coast World Heritage Site.

Facilities
Fairlynch Museum is housed in a listed, thatched marine cottage orné dating from 1811. It covers the history and geology of the region, and opened in 1967, offering exhibitions and a local archive. It possesses a large collection of period costumes. The town has a male-voice choir, which performs for charity.

Transport
Budleigh Salterton lies on the B3178 secondary road; the B3179 ends on the western edge of the town.

There are regular bus links with Exmouth and Sidmouth, one also providing a local town service.

Between 1897 and 1967, Budleigh Salterton was served by a station on the Budleigh Salterton Railway, built and operated by the London & South Western Railway, which ran from Tipton St Johns to Exmouth, which is now the nearest railway station at 8 km (5 miles).

Sports
Budleigh Salterton is home to the scenic East Devon Golf Club. Its 11-lawn croquet club (offering croquet, bowls and bridge), founded in the late 1860s, is one of the oldest and largest in the country. The first team of the Budleigh Salterton Association Football Club plays in the South West Peninsula League Division One East and there is a second team, a ladies' team and a youth team. In addition, there is a cricket club, a rifle club, and a games club offering tennis, bowls and other pursuits.

Churches
The Church of England in Budleigh Salterton originally took the form a chapel of ease under the parish of All Saints, East Budleigh. As the population grew, this was replaced in the 1890s by what became the Parish Church of St Peter in 1901. The church was heavily damaged by enemy aircraft bombing on 17 April 1942, but reopened in 1953. Today the Raleigh Mission Community at St Peter's, Budleigh Salterton, and All Saints, East Budleigh, are part of a joint mission with St Michael's, Otterton.

The Roman Catholic Church is also dedicated to St Peter. The Temple Methodist Church was completed in 1904 to replace a smaller chapel dating from 1812, which had been built by the bookseller James Lackington, an associate of John Wesley. There is a Baptist church in the town, whose congregation dates back to 1843.

Notable residents
In birth order:
The German-born English painter Hubert von Herkomer died here in 1914.
Belinda Lee, actress in British films of the 1950s, was born here in 1935. Her father managed a hotel in the town.
Charles Warrell, creator of the I-Spy series of children's books, lived here from his retirement in 1956 until his death in 1995.
Writer Dame Hilary Mantel (1952-2022), author of Wolf Hall and Bring Up the Bodies, lived here.

In popular culture
In 2003, Budleigh Salterton featured in episode 3 of series 3 of Top Gear as the destination for a road test by Jeremy Clarkson of a Bentley Continental GT. An episode of the BBC series Blackadder the Third refers to the town. In addition, the town is mentioned in season 6 episode 1 of the Granada Television's Sherlock Holmes (1984 TV series). It is also mentioned in Noël Coward's 1941 comedy Blithe Spirit. The town features regularly in the BBC radio satirical series Giles Wemmbley-Hogg Goes Off.

References

Further reading

External links

Budleigh Salterton Town Council website

 
Towns in Devon
Beaches of Devon
Geology of Devon
Jurassic Coast
Nude beaches
Seaside resorts in England
Civil parishes in Devon
East Devon District